Hot Springs Peak is a mountain located in the Skedaddle Mountains of southeast Lassen County, California. It is around 10 km (6.2 mi) east-northeast of Wendel, California. 

Standing at 2,333 m (7,654 ft.), it is the highest point in the Skedaddle Mountains.

Many mountains in the area (including Hot Springs Peak) were burned over during the Rush Fire in 2012, which at the time was the largest fire to ever take place in Lassen County.

See Also 

 Skedaddle Mountains

References 

Mountains of California
Mountains of Lassen County, California